Auh June-sun (5 May 1937 – 4 August 2022) was a South Korean businessman and politician. A member of the United Liberal Democrats, he served in the National Assembly from 1996 to 2000. Auh also served as the president and CEO of the Ahn-Gook Pharmaceutical Company, as well as the chairman of the Korea Pharmaceutical Manufacturers Association.

Auh died on 4 August 2022, at the age of 85.

References

1937 births
2022 deaths
United Liberal Democrats politicians
20th-century South Korean politicians
Members of the National Assembly (South Korea)
Chung-Ang University alumni
South Korean businesspeople
South Korean chief executives
Chief executives in the pharmaceutical industry
People from North Chungcheong Province
Hamjong Eo clan